The Abbey Library of Saint Gall is a significant medieval monastic library located in St. Gallen, Switzerland. In 1983, the library, as well as the Abbey of St. Gall, were designated a World Heritage Site, as “an outstanding example of a large Carolingian monastery and was, since the 8th century until its secularisation in 1805, one of the most important cultural centres in Europe”.

History and architecture 

The library was founded by Saint Othmar, founder of the Abbey of St. Gall. During a fire in 937, the Abbey was destroyed, but the library remained intact. The library hall, designed by the architect Peter Thumb in a Rococo style,  was constructed between 1758 and 1767.

Collections 
The library collection is the oldest in Switzerland, and one of the earliest and most important monastic libraries in the world. The library holds almost 160,000 volumes, with most available for public use. In addition to older printed books, the collection includes 1650 incunabula (books printed before 1500), and 2100 manuscripts dating back to the 8th through 15th centuries; among the most notable of the latter are items of Irish, Carolingian, and Ottonian production. These codices are held inside glass cases, each of which is topped by a carved cherub offering a visual clue as to the contents of the shelves below; for instance, the case of astronomy-related materials bears a cherub observing the books through a telescope. Books published before 1900 are to be read in a special reading room.
The manuscript B of the Nibelungenlied is kept here.

A virtual library has been created to provide broader access to the manuscripts: Codices Electronici Sangallenses. This project has been expanded to include codices from other libraries as well and is operating under the name e-codices. Currently, more than 600 manuscripts from the Abbey library of Saint Gall are available in digital format.

Manuscripts 
 Codex Sangallensis 18
 Codex Sangallensis 48
 Codex Sangallensis 878

See also 

 Codex Sangallensis (disambiguation), several codices
 List of World Heritage Sites in Europe
 :de:Stiftsarchiv St. Gallen

Notes

References 
 Beat Matthias von Scarpatetti: Die Handschriften der Stiftsbibliothek St. Gallen. Codices 547–669. Hagiographica, Historica, Geographica 8.–18. Jahrhundert. Harrassowitz, Wiesbaden 2003, . 
 Beat Matthias von Scarpatetti: Die Handschriften der Stiftsbibliothek St. Gallen. Codices 1726–1984 (14.–19. Jahrhundert). Beschreibendes Verzeichnis. Verlag am Klosterhof, St. Gallen 1983, .

External links 

e-codices, St. Gallen, Stiffsbibliothek
  
 Stiftsbibliothek Sankt Gallen  

 

 
Tourist attractions in St. Gallen (city)
Libraries in Switzerland
Museums in the canton of St. Gallen
World Heritage Sites in Switzerland
Monastic libraries